The Northern Command is a Command of the Indian Army. It was originally formed as the Northern Army of the British Indian Army in 1908. It was scrapped upon India's independence in 1947 and later re-raised in 1972. Currently, the XIV Corps (Leh), XV Corps (Srinagar), I Corps (Mathura) and XVI Corps (Nagrota) are under its control. Its present commander is Lieutenant General Upendra Dwivedi.

History
The Presidency armies were abolished with effect from 1 April 1895 when the three Presidency armies became the Indian Army. The Indian Army was divided into four Commands: Bengal Command, Bombay Command, Madras Command and Punjab Command,  each under a lieutenant general.

In 1908, the four commands were merged into two Armies: Northern Army and Southern Army. This system persisted until 1920 when the arrangement reverted to four commands again :- Eastern Command, Northern Command, Southern Command and Western Command. 

In 1937, Western Command was downgraded to become the Western Independent District. In April 1942,  the Western Independent District was absorbed into the Northern Command which itself was re-designated as North Western Army to guard the borders at North West Frontier during World War II. It controlled the Kohat, Peshawar, Rawalpindi, Baluchistan and Waziristan Districts. 

The formation reverted to the title Northern Command in November 1945. In 1947, India moved towards partition, with Northern Command HQ at Rawalpindi becoming the Army HQ of the newly formed Pakistan Army (as GHQ, Pakistan), with the rest of commands passing to the Indian Army.

In 1972, the Government of India decided to raise a separate command to oversee operations in the northern borders with Pakistan and China. Lt. Gen. P. S. Bhagat was appointed as its GOC-in-C in June 1972. Bhagat's main activities as Army Commander were the improvement of defence and the living and working condition of his troops. Headquarters for the command was established at Udhampur, J&K.

The XIV Corps (Leh), XV Corps (Srinagar) and XVI Corps (Nagrota) control the operational units in Northern Command. 71 Independent Sub Area is part of the Command. In 2001-02, during Operation Parakram the III Corps and its 57th Mountain Division were temporarily shifted into the command as a reserve.

Structure 
Currently, the Northern Commands has been assigned operational units under  four corps: XIV Corps, I Corps, XV Corps and XVI Corps. 

In 2021, the Strike One Corps was re-organised to join the Norther Command to assist at the Ladakh border with China.

Precursors (1895-1947)
Following is the List of precursors to the Northern Command and their commanders:

Punjab Command (1895-1907)

Northern Command (1904-1908)

Northern Army (1908-1920)

Northern Command (1920-1942)

North-Western Army (1942-1945)

Northern Command (1945-1947)

List of GOC-in-C of Northern Command (1972-present) 
Following is the list of General Officer Commanding-in-Chief of Northern Command after its re-raising in 1972:

References

Sources

Military units and formations of British India
Commands of the Indian Army
Military history of Khyber Pakhtunkhwa